Earth's Tropical Islands is a 2020 British television series co-produced by the BBC Natural History Unit and PBS. It premiered on 1 January 2020 in the United Kingdom on BBC Two. The series has three episodes, each of which features a different tropical island.

Episodes

References

External links 
 

2020 British television series debuts
2020 British television series endings
2020s British documentary television series
BBC high definition shows
BBC television documentaries
Nature educational television series
Documentary films about Hawaii
Television shows set in Hawaii